Yuri Chekranov (born c. 1943) is a former international speedway rider from the Soviet Union.

Speedway career 
Chekranov reached the final of the Speedway World Team Cup in the 1964 Speedway World Team Cup where he won a silver medal.

World final appearances

World Team Cup
 1964 -  Abensberg, Abensberg Stadion (with Boris Samorodov / Igor Plekhanov / Gennady Kurilenko) - 2nd - 25pts (6)
 1965 -  Kempten (with Gennady Kurilenko / Igor Plekhanov / Vladimir Sokolov / Viktor Trofimov) - 4th - 7pts (2)

Individual Ice Speedway World Championship
1966  2 rounds, 4th

References 

Russian speedway riders
1940s births
Living people
Year of birth uncertain
Sportspeople from Ufa